Ethelreda is an English feminine given name of Old English origin, Æðelþryð, signified ''noble, strength''.

Notable people named Ethelreda, Etheldreda or Etheldritha include:

 Æthelthryth (c. 636–679), also known as Ethelreda, Anglo-Saxon saint, East Anglian princess, a Fenland and Northumbrian queen and Abbess of Ely
 Ælfthryth of Crowland (died c. 835), also known as Etheldritha, Anglo-Saxon saint, daughter of King Offa of Mercia
 Ethelreda (daughter of Gospatric), 11th century daughter of Gospatric, Earl of Northumbria, and wife of Duncan II of Scotland
 Ethelreda Ethel Baxter (1883–1963), Scottish cook and businesswoman
 Etheldreda Laing (1872–1960), British photographer 
 Ethelreda Leopold (1914–1998), American film actress
 Ethelreda Malte (c. 1527/35–c. 1559), English courtier reputed to be an illegitimate daughter of King Henry VIII
 Etheldreda Nakimuli-Mpungu (born 1974), Ugandan professor, researcher, epidemiologist and psychiatrist
 Etheldreda Townshend (1708–1788), English society hostess
 Etheldreda, a character in the Demonbane visual novel, anime and manga series Demonbane

See also
 Æthelred

English feminine given names
Old English given names